An expansion chamber is an exhaust system used on a two-stroke cycle engine to enhance its power output by improving its volumetric efficiency.

Expansion chamber may also refer to: 

 A large-scale expansion tank such as used in a pumping station, see Expansion tank#Larger systems.
 One of the essential components of the original and most common design of a condensation particle counter and similar instruments.